Ye-U Township  is a township in Shwebo District in the Sagaing Region of Burma. The principal town is Ye-U.

References

External links
Maplandia World Gazetteer - map showing the township boundary

Townships of Sagaing Region